The 2015–16 Nebraska Cornhuskers women's basketball team will represent University of Nebraska–Lincoln during the 2015–16 NCAA Division I women's basketball season. The Cornhuskers, led by 14th year head coach Connie Yori, play their home games at Pinnacle Bank Arena and were members of the Big Ten Conference. They finished the season 18–13, 9–9 in Big Ten play to finish in a tie for seventh place. They lost in the second round of the Big Ten women's tournament to Rutgers. They were invited to the Women's National Invitation Tournament where they lost to Northern Iowa in the first round.

On April 5, 2016, Connie Yori resigns following an alleged investigation into how she treated her players. She finished at Nebraska with a 14-year record of 280–166.

Roster

Schedule

|-
!colspan=9 style="background: #E11D38; color: #ffffff"| Exhibition

|-
!colspan=9 style="background: #E11D38; color: #ffffff"| Non-conference regular season

|-
!colspan=9 style="background: #E11D38; color: #ffffff"| Big Ten regular season

|-
!colspan=9 style="background:#E11D38; color:#ffffff;"| Big Ten Women's Tournament

|-
!colspan=9 style="background:#E11D38; color:#ffffff;"| WNIT

Source

Rankings
2015–16 NCAA Division I women's basketball rankings

See also
2015–16 Nebraska Cornhuskers men's basketball team

References

Nebraska Cornhuskers women's basketball seasons
Nebraska
2016 Women's National Invitation Tournament participants
Cornhusk
Cornhusk